This is a list of people who served as Lord Lieutenant of County Meath, Ireland.

There were lieutenants of counties in Ireland until the reign of James II, when they were renamed governors. The office of Lord Lieutenant was recreated on 23 August 1831.

Governors
 Jenico Preston, 7th Viscount Gormanston, 1689–1691
 Edward Moore, 5th Earl of Drogheda: c.1748 (died 1758)
 Charles Moore, 1st Marquess of Drogheda, 1759–1822
 Thomas Taylour, 1st Marquess of Headfort, 1823–1829 
 Edward Bligh, 5th Earl of Darnley: 1830–1831
 James Lenox William Naper: –1831
 Sir Marcus Somerville, 4th Baronet: –1831
 The Hon. Edward Bligh: –1831

Lord Lieutenants
 The 5th Earl of Darnley: 28 October 1831 – 11 February 1835
 The 14th Baron of Dunsany: 11 April 1835 – 11 December 1848
 The 9th Earl of Fingall: 10 January 1849 – 21 April 1869
 General The 2nd Marquess Conyngham: 31 May 1869 – 17 July 1876
 The 3rd Marquis of Headfort: 15 September 1876 – 22 July 1894
 Simon Mangan of Dunboyne Castle: 18 June 1895 – 1906
 Sir Nugent Everard, 1st Baronet: 17 August 1906 – 1922

References

 
Meath
History of County Meath